Georgetown is the name of several unincorporated communities in the U.S. state of West Virginia.

Georgetown, Berkeley County, West Virginia
Georgetown, Lewis County, West Virginia
Georgetown, Marshall County, West Virginia
Georgetown, Monongalia County, West Virginia